Fishers station is an abandoned railroad station in Philadelphia, Pennsylvania. It is located at 335 East Logan Street. Built by the Reading Railroad, it later served SEPTA Regional Rail's  R7 Chestnut Hill East Line. The station was closed in 1992 for the RailWorks project and not reopened due to low ridership. The station's shelters still stand, though the stairs to access them from street level and the underpass from one platform to another have been fenced off.

References

Railway stations closed in 1992
Former SEPTA Regional Rail stations

Former railway stations in Philadelphia